The Ignatz Awards recognize outstanding achievements in comics and cartooning by small press creators or creator-owned projects published by larger publishers. They have been awarded each year at the Small Press Expo since 1997, only skipping a year in 2001 due to the show's cancellation after the September 11 attacks.  SPX has been held in either Bethesda,  North Bethesda, or Silver Spring, Maryland.

The Ignatz Awards are named in honour of George Herriman and his strip Krazy Kat, which featured a brick-throwing mouse named Ignatz.

Awards criteria 
As one of the few festival awards rewarded in comics, the Ignatz Awards are voted on by attendees of the annual Small Press Expo (SPX, or The Expo, its corporate name), a weekend convention and tradeshow showcasing creator-owned comics. Nominations for the Ignatz Awards are made by a five-member jury panel consisting of comic book professionals.

The jury panel remains anonymous (from both the public as well as each other) until the announcement of the awards. Jurors are prohibited from nominating their own work. However, there is no prohibition of one jury member's work being nominated for an award by his or her fellow jurors.

History 
The first comics industry awards given the title "Ignatz" originated at the OrlandoCon, held in Orlando, Florida, from 1974 to 1994. The current Ignatz Awards are not connected with OrlandoCon. The SPX Ignatz Awards were conceived in 1996 by SPX organizer Chris Oarr and cartoonist Ed Brubaker. Their original mandate, to set the Ignatz apart from "mainstream" awards like the Eisner Awards, was that the work nominated be creator-owned, and focus more on work done by a single writer/artist.

The Award was administered by Jeff Alexander from 1998 to 2006, when they were taken over by Greg McElhatton. During his tenure as Ignatz Award Coordinator, Alexander drew a strip for the annual award program in George Herriman's style.

Award categories 
The Ignatz is awarded in the following categories:
Outstanding Artist
Outstanding Anthology (added in 2017)
Outstanding Collection (added in 2017)
Outstanding Graphic Novel (added in 2005)
Outstanding Story
Promising New Talent
Outstanding Series
Outstanding Comic
Outstanding Minicomic
Outstanding Online Comic (added in 2001)

Discontinued categories 
Outstanding Graphic Novel or Collection (1997–2004, replaced in 2005 by two separate awards)
Outstanding Debut Comic (2000–2008)
Outstanding Anthology or Collection (2005–2016, replaced in 2017 by two separate awards)

Award winners and nominees

Outstanding Artist
1997 Seth, Palookaville (Drawn & Quarterly)
Gilbert Hernandez, New Love (Fantagraphics Books)
Dylan Horrocks, Pickle (Black Eye Productions)
C. S. Morse, Soulwind (Image Comics)
Gary Panter, Jimbo (Zongo Comics)
1998 Dave Sim, Cerebus (Aardvark-Vanaheim)
Joe Chiappetta, Silly Daddy (self-published)
Nick Craine, Portrait of a Thousand Punks: Hard Core Logo (House of Anansi Press Ltd.)
Gilbert Hernandez, Luba (Fantagraphics Books)
Jaime Hernandez, Penny Century (Fantagraphics)
1999 Frank Cho, Liberty Meadows #1 (Insight Studios Group)
Eric Shanower, Age of Bronze (Image Comics)
Dylan Horrocks, Hicksville (Blackeye)
Dave Choe, Slow Jams (Non #3 & 4, Red Ink)
Pat McEown, Kissin' Cousin (Heart Throb #4)
2000 Dave Cooper, Weasel (Fantagraphics Books)
Craig Thompson, Good-Bye, Chunky Rice (Top Shelf Productions)
Rod Espinoza, The Courageous Princess (Antarctic Press)
Francesca Ghermandi, Pastil (Phoenix Enterprise Publishing Co.)
Bill Presing, Rex Steele-Nazi Smasher (Monkeysuit Press)
2001 Ignatz Awards cancelled after 9-11 Attacks
Donna Barr, The Desert Peach (A Fine Line Press)
Jason Lutes, Berlin (Drawn & Quarterly)
Carla Speed McNeil, Finder (Lightspeed Press)
Tony Millionaire, Maakies (Fantagraphics Books), Sock Monkey (Dark Horse Comics)
Jim Woodring, Frank (Fantagraphics Books)
2002 Megan Kelso, Artichoke Tales #1, Non #5 (Highwater Books and Red Ink Press)
Renée French, The Soap Lady (Top Shelf)
Paul Hornschemeier, Sequential, Forlorn Funnies (I Don't Get It Graphics and Absence Of Ink Press)
John Kerschbaum, Homecoming, Petey & Pussy (Fontanelle Press)
Thomas Ott, Greetings From Hellville (Fantagraphics Books)
2003 Jason Little, Shutterbug Follies (Doubleday Graphic Novels)
Renée French, Rosetta (Alternative Comics),  Tinka (Atheneum)
Dean Haspiel, Aim to Dazzle (Alternative Comics)
Lorenzo Mattotti, Dr. Jekyll & Mr. Hyde (NBM Publishing)
Scott Mills, My Own Little Empire (AdHouse Books), Space Devil (ModernTales.com)
2004 Craig Thompson, Blankets (Top Shelf Productions)
Chester Brown, Louis Riel (Drawn & Quarterly)
Daniel Clowes, Eightball #23 (Fantagraphics Books)
Juanjo Guarnido, Blacksad (iBooks)
Joe Sacco, The Fixer (Drawn & Quarterly)
2005 David B, Epileptic (Pantheon), Babel (Drawn & Quarterly)
 Jeffrey Brown, Bighead (Top Shelf Productions)
 Roger Langridge, Fred the Clown (Fantagraphics)
 Seth, Clyde Fans Book 1 (Drawn & Quarterly)
 Craig Thompson, Carnet de Voyage (Top Shelf Productions)
2006 Tony Millionaire, Billy Hazelnuts (Fantagraphics Books)
 Jordan Crane, The Clouds Above (Fantagraphics Books)
 Renee French, The Ticking (Top Shelf Productions)
 Anders Nilsen, Big Questions #7 and #8 (Drawn & Quarterly)
 Chris Ware, Acme Novelty Library #16 (Fantagraphics Books)
2007 Jaime Hernandez, Love & Rockets (Fantagraphics Books)
Vanessa Davis, Papercutter #4 (Tugboat Press), Kramers Ergot #6 (Buenaventura Press)
John Hankiewicz, Asthma (Sparkplug Comic Books)
Rutu Modan, Exit Wounds (Drawn & Quarterly)
Ted Stearn, Fuzz & Pluck in Splitsville #4 (Fantagraphics Books)
2008 Laura Park, Do Not Disturb My Waking Dream (self-published)
Warren Craghead, How to Be Everywhere (Self-published)
Lat, Town Boy (First Second Books)
Michel Rabagliati, Paul Goes Fishing (Drawn & Quarterly)
Jillian Tamaki, Skim (Groundwood Books)
2009 Nate Powell, Swallow Me Whole (Top Shelf)
Tim Hensley, Mome (Fantagraphics), Kramer's Ergot #7 (Buenaventura)
Richard Sala, Delphine (Fantagraphics/Coconino)
Josh Simmons, Mome (Fantagraphics)
Carol Tyler, You’ll Never Know, Book One: A Good and Decent Man (Fantagraphics Books)
2010 Eddie Campbell, Alec: The Years Have Pants (A Life-Sized Omnibus) (Top Shelf Productions)
Al Columbia, Pim & Francie: The Golden Bear Days (Fantagraphics Books)
Mike Dawson, Troop 142 (self-published & http://troop142.mikedawsoncomics.com)
John Pham, Sublife #2 (Fantagraphics Books)
Sully, The Hipless Boy (Conundrum Press)
2011 Joseph Lambert, I Will Bite You (Secret Acres)
Michael DeForge, Lose #3 (Koyama Press)
Edie Fake, Gaylord Phoenix (Secret Acres)
Renée French, H-Day (Picturebox)
Carol Tyler, You’ll Never Know, Vol 2: Collateral Damage (Fantagraphics Books)
2012 Jaime Hernandez, Love and Rockets: New Stories (Fantagraphics Books)
Marc Bell, Pure Pajamas (Drawn & Quarterly)
Inés Estrada, Ojitos Borrosos (Self-published)
Craig Thompson, Habibi (Pantheon)
Matthew Thurber, 1 800 Mice (Picturebox)
2013 Michael DeForge, Lose #4 (Koyama Press)
Lilli Carré, Heads or Tails (Fantagraphics Books)
Miriam Katin, Letting It Go (Drawn & Quarterly)
Ulli Lust, Today is the Last Day of the Rest of Your Life (Fantagraphics Books)
Patrick McEown, Hair Shirt (Harry N. Abrams)
2014 Sam Bosma, Fantasy Basketball 
Kim Deitch, The Amazing, Enlightening and Absolutely True Adventures of Katherine Whaley
Sophie Goldstein, Darwin Carmichael Is Going to Hell; Edna II; House of Women
Ed Piskor, Hip Hop Family Tree (Vol. 1)
Jesse Reklaw, Couch Tag
2015 Emily Carroll – Through The Woods
Ed Luce – Wuvable Oaf
Roman Muradov – (In a Sense) Lost and Found
Jillian Tamaki – SuperMutant Magic Academy
Noah Van Sciver – Saint Cole
2016 Tillie Walden – The End of Summer
Daniel Clowes – Patience
Ryan Heshka – Mean Girls Club
Kevin Huizenga – Ganges
Noah Van Sciver – Disquiet
2017 Emil Ferris – My Favorite Thing Is Monsters
Pablo Auldadell – Paradise Lost
Manuele Fior – The Interview
Keren Katz – The Academic Hour
Barbara Yelin – Irmina
2018 Richie Pope – That Box We Sit On
Yvan Alagbé – Yellow Negroes and Other Imaginary Creatures
Eddy Atoms – Pinky & Pepper Forever
Tommi Parrish – The Lie and How We Told It
Sophie Standing – Anxiety is Really Strange
2019 Rosemary Valero-O'Connell – Laura Dean Keeps Breaking Up with Me
Koren Shadmi – Highwayman
Lucy Knisley – Kid Gloves
Sloane Leong – Prism Stalker
Ezra Claytan Daniels – Upgrade Soul
2020 Rosemary Valero-O'Connell
Ana Galvañ – Press Enter to Continue
Michael DeForge – Familiar Face
Katie Hicks – Guts
Tianran Qu – Slices of Life: 100 Comic Montage
2021 Lee Lai – Stone Fruit
Ashanti Fortson – Leaf Lace
Arantza Peña Popo – Lavender Scare
Damien Roudeau – Crude
Karl Stevens – Penny

Outstanding Anthology

2017 Elements: Fire – An Anthology by Creators of Color, edited by Taneka Stotts
ALPHABET: The LGBTQAIU Creators from Prism Comics, edited by Jon Macy and Tara Madison Avery
Comic Book Slumber Party's Deep Space Canine, edited by Hanhah K. Chapman
POWER & MAGIC: The Queer Witch Comics Anthology, edited by Joamette Gil
Spanish Fever: Stories by the New Spanish Cartoonists, edited by Javier Olivares & Santiago Garcia

[Note:  After winning, Stotts arranged to have her Ignatz Award smashed with a sledgehammer, and the shards individually mounted onto separate wooden bases with engraved nameplates, so that she could give a piece of the award to each of the contributors to her anthology.]

2018 Comics for Choice – edited by Hazel Newlevant, Whit Taylor and Ø.K. Fox
La Raza Anthology: Unidos y Fuertes – edited by Kat Fajardo & Pablo Castro
Ink Brick #8 – edited by Alexander Rothmans, Paul K. Tunis, and Alexey Sokolin
Bottoms Up, Tales of Hitting Rock Bottom – edited by J.T. Yost
Lovers Only – edited by Mickey Zacchilli
2019 We’re Still Here: An All-Trans Comics Anthology – edited by Tara Avery and Jeanne Thornton
Electrum – edited by Der-shing Helmer
Wayward Sisters – edited by Allison O'Toole
Family – The Nib Magazine – edited by Matt Bors, Matt Lubchanksy and Eleri Harris
Death – The Nib Magazine – edited by Matt Bors, Matt Lubchanksy and Eleri Harris
2020 Be Gay, Do Comics – edited by The Nib
Sweaty Palms Volume 2 – Sage Coffey
Dates III – edited by Zora Gilbert and Cat Parra
The Anthology of Mind – Tommi Musturi
LAAB Magazine #4 – edited by Ronald Wimberly and Joshua O'Neill
2021 Glaeolia 2
A Queer Prisoner's Anthology IV – edited by Casper Cendre
Bystander – Kadak Collective
Confined Before Covid: A Pandemic Anthology by LGBTQ Prisoners – ABO Comix
First Wave: Comics from the Early Months of China's Outbreak – edited by Xinmei Liu

Outstanding Collection

2017 Our Cats Are More Famous Than Us: A Johnny Wander Collection, by Ananth Hirsh and Yuko Ota
Boundless, by Jillian Tamaki
The Complete Neat Stuff, by Peter Bagge
Hip Hop Family Tree, Vol. 4, by Ed Piskor
Time Clock, by Leslie Stein
2018 Sex Fantasy – Sophia Foster-Dimino
Beirut Won’t Cry – Mazen Kerbaj
Blackbird Days – Manuele Fior
Language Barrier – Hannah K. Lee
Super Late Bloomer: My Early Days in Transition – Julia Kaye
2019 Girl Town – Casey Nowak
Love Letters to Jane’s World – Paige Braddock
Dirty Plotte – Julie Doucet
Leaving Richard’s Valley – Michael DeForge
This Woman’s Work – Julie Delporte
2020 GLEEM – Eddie Carasco
Inappropriate – Gabrielle Bell
Glenn Ganges in: The River at Night – Kevin Huizenga
The Complete Works of Fante Bukowski – Noah Van Sciver
Slices of Life: 100 Comic Montage – Tianran Qu
2021 The Crossroads at Midnight – Abby Howard
The Pleasure of the Text – Sami Alwani
Nineteen – Ancco
Do You Think I Look Like a Girl? – Tess Scilipoti
The Sky is Blue with a Single Cloud – Kuniko Tsurita

Outstanding Graphic Novel
2005 Persepolis 2: The Story of a Return, Marjane Satrapi (Pantheon)
 Bighead by Jeffrey Brown (Top Shelf Productions)
 Carnet de Voyage, Craig Thompson (Top Shelf Productions)
 Cinema Panopticum, Thomas Ott (L'Association, Fantagraphics)
 Why Are You Doing This?, Jason (Fantagraphics Books)
 2006 Tricked, Alex Robinson (Top Shelf Productions)
 The Clouds Above, Jordan Crane (Fantagraphics Books)
 Fun Home, Alison Bechdel (Houghton Mifflin)
 The Ticking, Renee French (Top Shelf Productions)
 Wimbledon Green, Seth (Drawn & Quarterly)
 2007 Don't Go Where I Can't Follow, Anders Nilsen (Drawn & Quarterly)
 Aya, Marguerite Abouet and Clément Oubrerie (Drawn & Quarterly)
 Bookhunter, Jason Shiga (Sparkplug Comic Books)
 Exit Wounds, Rutu Modan (Drawn & Quarterly)
 House, Josh Simmons (Fantagraphics Books)
 2008 Skim, Mariko Tamaki and Jillian Tamaki (Groundwood Books)
 The Hot Breath of War, Trevor Alixopulos (Sparkplug Comic Books)
 Notes for a War Story, Gipi (First Second Books)
 Paul Goes Fishing, Michel Rabagliati (Drawn & Quarterly)
 Spent, Joe Matt (Drawn & Quarterly)
2009 Acme Novelty Library #19, Chris Ware (Drawn & Quarterly)
 Disappearance Diary, Hideo Azuma (Fanfare/Ponent Mon)
 Drop-In, Dave Lapp (Conundrum)
 Nicolas, Pascal Girard (Drawn & Quarterly)
 You’ll Never Know, Book One: A Good and Decent Man, Carol Tyler (Fantagraphics)
2010 Market Day, James Sturm (Drawn & Quarterly)
The Complete Jack Survives, Jerry Moriarty (Buentaventura Press)
Pim & Francie: The Golden Bear Days, Al Columbia (Fantagraphics Books)
Summit of the Gods Vol. 1, Yumemakura Baku and Jiro Taniguchi (Fanfare/Ponent Mon)
Years of the Elephant, Willy Linthout (Fanfare/Ponent Mon)
2011 Gaylord Phoenix, Edie Fake (Secret Acres)
The Heavy Hand, Chris Cilla (Sparkplug)
Hereville: How Mirka Got Her Sword, Barry Deutsch (Amulet Books)
Special Exits, Joyce Farmer (Fantagraphics Books)
You’ll Never Know, Vol 2: Collateral Damage, Carol Tyler (Fantagraphics)
2012 Big Questions, Anders Nilsen (Drawn & Quarterly)
Harvey Pekar’s Cleveland, Harvey Pekar and Joseph Remnant (Top Shelf/Zip)
My Friend Dahmer, Derf Backderf (Abrams ComicArts)
Troop 142, Mike Dawson (Secret Acres)
A Zoo In Winter, Jiro Taniguchi (Fanfare/Ponent Mon)
2013 Today is the Last Day of the Rest of Your Life, Ulli Lust (Fantagraphics Books)
The Property, Rutu Modan (Drawn & Quarterly)
Susceptible, Genevieve Castree (Drawn & Quarterly))
When David Lost His Voice, Judith Vanistendael (Harry N. Abrams)
You'll Never Know Vol. 3: A Soldier's Heart, Carol Tyler (Fantagraphics Books)
2014 This One Summer, Jillian Tamaki and Mariko Tamaki
The Amazing, Enlightening and Absolutely True Adventures of Katherine Whaley, Kim Deitch
The Boxer, Reinhard Kleist
Boxers and Saints, Gene Luen Yang
War of Streets and Houses, Sophie Yanow
2015 The Oven, Sophie Goldstein
Beauty, Kerascoët and Hubert
Rav, Mickey Zacchilli
Saint Cole, Noah Van Sciver
Wendy, Walter Scott
2016 Hot Dog Taste Test, Lisa Hanawalt
Nod Away, Josh Cotter
Sick, Gabby Schulz
Soldier’s Heart, Carol Tyler
Trashed, Derf Backderf
2017 My Favorite Thing is Monsters, Emil FerrisBand for Life, Anya Davidson
Eartha, Cathy Malkasian
March: Book 3, John Lewis, Nate Powell, Andrew Aydin
Tetris, Box Brown2018 Why Art? – Eleanor DavisRun for It: Stories of Slaves Who Fought for Their Freedom – Marcelo D'Salete
Uncomfortably Happily – Yeon-sik Hong
The Lie and How We Told It – Tommi Parrish
Anti-Gone – Connor Willumsen2019 Laura Dean Keeps Breaking Up with Me – Mariko Tamaki & Rosemary Valero-O'ConnellUpgrade Soul – Ezra Clayton Daniels
Woman World – Aminder Dhaliwal
Highwayman – Koren Shadmi
Gender Queer – Maia Kobabe2020 Hot Comb – Ebony FlowersThis Was Our Pact – Ryan Andrews
How I Tried to be a Good Person – Ulli Lust
Skip - Molly Mendoza
Pittsburgh – Frank Santoro2021 Stone Fruit – Lee LaiCome Home, Indio – Jim Terry
A Map to the Sun – Sloane Leong
Mr. H: Portrait of a High School Art Teacher – Nico Harriman

Outstanding Story
 1997 From Hell by Alan Moore and Eddie Campbell (Kitchen Sink Press) "A Death In the Family" by Joe Chiappetta, Silly Daddy (self-published)
 "Ghost World" Daniel Clowes, Eightball (Fantagraphics)
 "Hicksville" Dylan Horrocks, Pickle (Black Eye Productions)
 "It's a Good Life if You Don't Weaken" by Seth, Palookaville (Drawn & Quarterly)
 1998 "Ghost World" by Daniel Clowes, Eightball (Fantagraphics) "Jimmy Corrigan" by Chris Ware, Acme Novelty Library (Fantagraphics)
 "Letters from Venus" by Gilbert Hernandez, New Love (Fantagraphics)
 "New York City Diary" Julie Doucet, Dirty Plotte (Drawn & Quarterly)
 "Soba" Joe Sacco, Stories From Bosnia (Drawn & Quarterly)
 1999 "David Boring" Daniel Clowes, Eightball #20 (Fantagraphics) "Sex & Violence: part 2" by David Lapham, Stray Bullets #18 (El Capitan Books)
 Cavewoman: Jungle Tales by Budd Root (Basement Comics)
 "Over the Line" by Scott Roberts, Patty-Cake and Friends #13 (Slave Labor)
 "Slow Jams" by David Choe, Non #3 & #4 (Red Ink)
 2000 "Jimmy Corrigan, Smartest Kid On Earth" by Chris Ware, The Acme Novelty Library (Fantagraphics Books) "The Bridge" by Jason, Mjau Mjau No. 6 (Jippi Forlag)
 Cave-In by Brian Ralph, (Highwater Books)
 From Hell by Alan Moore and Eddie Campbell, (Eddie Campbell Comics, distributed by Top Shelf Productions)
 Jug by Androo Robinson, (self-published)
 2001 Ignatz Awards cancelled after 9-11 Attacks "Bygone" by Rutu Modan, Flipper Vol. 2 (Actus Tragicus/Top Shelf Productions)
 Herobear and the Kid No. 2 by Mike Kunkel (Astonish Comics)
 The Nimrod No. 5 by Lewis Trondheim (Fantagraphics Books)
 "Popeye the Savior Man" by Sean Bieri, Jumbo Jape (self-published)
 "Stocks Are Surging" by Tom Hart, The Collected Hutch Owen (Top Shelf Productions)
 2002 Trenches by Scott Mills (Top Shelf Productions) "Retreat" by Megan Kelso, Artichoke Tales #1 (Highwater Books)
 "Royal Sable" by Mira Friedmann, Actus Box Series (Actus Tragicus)
 "Where Hats Go" by Kurt Wolfgang, Non #5 (Red Ink Press)
 "Wir Mussën Wissen, Wir Werden Wissen (We Must Know, We Will Know)" by Ron Regé, Jr., Drawn & Quarterly volume 4 (Drawn & Quarterly)
 2003 Fleep by Jason Shiga (Sparkplug Comic Books) "30,000 Hours to Kill" by Gilbert Hernandez Love & Rockets #6 (Fantagraphics Books)
 Black Hole #10 by Charles Burns (Fantagraphics Books)
 "Hipman" by R. Crumb Mystic Funnies #3 (Fantagraphics Books)
 Untitled second story by Jason, Sshhhh! (Fantagraphics Books)
 2004 "Glenn Ganges", Drawn & Quarterly Showcase Volume 1, Kevin Huizenga (Drawn & Quarterly) "The Little Things", Rubber Necker #3, by Nick Bertozzi (Alternative Comics)
 “Maggie”, Love and Rockets v.2 #8, Jaime Hernandez  (Fantagraphics Books)
 “Paul in the Metro”, Drawn & Quarterly #5, Michel Rabagliati (Drawn & Quarterly)
 "Portrait of My Dad", McSweeney’s Quarterly Concern #13, David Heatley (McSweeney's, Ltd.)
 2005 Dogs and Water, Anders Nilsen (Drawn & Quarterly) "Dumb Solitaire", Love and Rockets #11 and #13, Gilbert Hernandez (Fantagraphics)
 "Homme De Le Bois", The Frank Ritza Papers, David Collier (Drawn & Quarterly)
 The Legend of Wild Man Fischer, Dennis P. Eichhorn and J.R. Williams  (Top Shelf Productions)
 "Onion Jack", Superior Showcase #0, Joel Priddy (AdHouse Books)
 2006 Ganges #1, Kevin Huizenga (Fantagraphics Books) "Prebaby", Scrublands, Joe Daly (Fantagraphics Books)
 "Somersaulting", Drawn & Quarterly Showcase #3, Sammy Harkham (Drawn & Quarterly)
 "To Capt. Ayres", MOME Winter 2006, Andrice Arp (Fantagraphics Books)
 We Are On Our Own, Miriam Katin (Drawn & Quarterly)
 2007 "Felix", Drawn & Quarterly Showcase Vol. 4, Gabrielle Bell (Drawn & Quarterly) Delphine #1–2, Richard Sala (Fantagraphics Books/Coconico Press)
 Don't Go Where I Can't Follow, Anders Nilsen (Drawn & Quarterly)
 The End, Anders Nilsen (Fantagraphics Books/Coconico Press)
 "Martha Gregory", Asthma, John Hankiewicz (Sparkplug Comic Books)
 2008 The Thing About Madeleine, Lilli Carré (Self-published) "Americus", Papercutter #7, MK Reed and Jonathan Hill (Tugboat Press)
 "The Candy Rod", Hotwire Comics #2, Onsmith (Fantagraphics Books)
 "The Galactic Funnels", Mome #11, Dash Shaw (Fantagraphics Books)
 "The Urn", Inkweed, Chris Wright (Sparkplug Comic Books)
 2009 "Willy," Papercutter #10, Damien Jay (Tugboat) "The Carnival," Mome #14, Lilli Carré (Fantagraphics)
 Disappearance Diary, Hideo Azuma (Fanfare/Ponent Mon)
 "Seeing Eye Dogs of Mars," Acme Novelty Library #19, Chris Ware (Drawn & Quarterly)
 "Untitled," Drawn & Quarterly Showcase Book 5, Amanda Vähämäki (Drawn & Quarterly)2010 Monsters, Ken Dahl (Secret Acres)"John Wesley Harding", The Red Monkey Double Happiness Book, Joe Daly (Fantagraphics Books)
Market Day, James Sturm (Drawn & Quarterly)
"Turd Place", The Hipless Boy, Sully (Conundrum Press)
"Untitled", Mome #16, Laura Park (Fantagraphics Books)2011 "Browntown", Love and Rockets: New Stories #3, Jaime Hernandez (Fantagraphics)"Blood of the Virgin", Crickets #3, Sammy Harkham (self-published)
"LINT", Acme Novelty Library #20, Chris Ware (Drawn & Quarterly)
"The most gripping mind-exploding triumphantly electric of our time", Papercutter #15, Jonas Madden-Conner (Tugboat Press)
"Weekends Abroad", Three #1, Eric Orner (self-published)2012 “Return to Me,” Love and Rockets: New Stories #4, Jaime Hernandez (Fantagraphics)1 800 Mice, Matthew Thurber (Picturebox)
“Keith or Steve”, Mome #22, Nick Drnaso (Fantagraphics)
Lucille, Ludovic Debeurme (Top Shelf)
“The  Weeper”, Papercutter #17, Jason Martin and Jesse Reklaw (Tugboat Press)2013 Gold Star, John Martz (Retrofit Comics)“Arid,” Secret Prison #7, Tom Hart (Retrofit Comics)
Birdseye Bristoe, Dan Zettwoch (Drawn & Quarterly)
"The Carnival", Heads or Tails, Lilli Carré (Fantagraphics)
“Neighbors”, Tusen Hjärtan Stark #1, Joanna Helgren (Domino Books)2014 "Brownout Biscuit" (from Octopus Pie): Dead Forever, Meredith GranDestination X, Jon Martz
"The Grassy Knoll", Nick Drnaso
"Jobs", Life Zone, Simon Hanselmann
"Mom", Viewotron #2, Sam Sharpe2015 Sex Coven from Frontier #7, Jillian Tamaki Doctors, Dash Shaw
 Me As a Baby from Lose #6, Michael DeForge 
 Nature Lessons from The Late Child And Other Animals, Marguerite Van Cook and James Romberger 
 Weeping Flower, Grows in Darkness, by Kris Mukai2016 My Hot Date, Noah Van Sciver The Hunter, Joe Sparrow
 Megg & Mogg in Amsterdam from Megg & Mogg in Amsterdam and Other Stories, Simon Hanselmann
 Killing and Dying, Adrian Tomine
 “Shrine of the Monkey God, from Kramers Ergot #8, Kim Deitch2017 Diana’s Electric Tongue, Carolyn NowakMarch: Book 3, John Lewis, Nate Powell, Andrew Aydin
My Favorite Thing is Monsters, Emil Ferris
"Small Enough" from Diary Comics, Dustin Harbin
"Too Hot to Be Cool" from Elements, Maddi Gonzalez2018 How the Best Hunter in the Village Met Her Death – Molly OstertagYellow Negroes and Other Imaginary Creatures – Yvan Alabge
Why Art? – Eleanor Davis
Rhode Island Me – Michael DeForge
The Lie and How We Told It – Tommi Parrish2019 Laura Dean Keeps Breaking Up with Me – Mariko Tamaki & Rosemary Valero-O'ConnellSacred Heart Vol 2 Part 1: Livin’ in the Future – Liz Suburbia
Sincerely, Harriet – Sarah Winifred Searle
Woman World – Aminder Dhaliwal
The Dead Eye and the Deep Blue Sea – Vannak Anan Prum2020 The Hard Tomorrow – Eleanor Davis"Little Red Riding Hood" – Gabrielle Bell
The Lab – Allison Conway
BTTM FDRS – Ezra Daniels and Dan Passmore
The Weight #9 – Melissa Mendes2021 Personal Companion – Freddy CarrascoMisguided Love – Raquelle Jac
Nineteen – Ancco
Moms – Yeong-shin Ma
The Hazards of Love – Stan Stanley

Promising New Talent1997 Debbie Drechsler, Nowhere (Drawn & Quarterly)Tom Hart, The Sands (Black Eye Productions)
C. S. Morse, Soulwind (Image Comics)
Walt Holcombe, King of Persia (self published through Accordion Press)
Steve Weissman, Yikes! (Alternative Press)1998 Carla Speed McNeil, Finder (Lightspeed Press)Tara Jenkins, Galaxion (Helikon Press)
Matt Madden, Black Candy (Black Eye Books)
Ron Rege, Skibber Bee Bye (self-published)
Chris Oliveros, The Envelope Manufacturer (Drawn & Quarterly)1999 Brian Ralph, Fireball #7 (Fort Thunder)Leland Myrick, Sweet (Adept Books)
Madison Clell, Cuckoo (Green Door Studios)
Jason Little, Jack's Luck Runs Out (Top Shelf Productions)
Dave Kiersh, Is Kissing a Girl Who Smokes Like Kissing an Ashtray, Non #4 (Red Ink)2000 Nick Bertozzi, Boswash (Luxurious Comics)Ben Catmull, Paper Theater (self-published)
Rod Espinosa, The Courageous Princess (Antarctic Press)
Kevin Huizenga, Supermonster (self-published)
Stephen Notley, Bob the Angry Flower (self-published)2001 Ignatz Awards cancelled after 9-11 AttacksTomer and Asaf Hanuka, Bipolar, self-published
Mike Kunkel, Herobear and the Kid, Astonish Comics
Metaphrog, Louis: Red Letter Day, Metaphrog
Rutu Modan, Flipper Vol. 2, Actus Tragicus/Top Shelf Productions
Ben Steckler, Get BenT, self-published2002 Greg Cook, Catch as Catch Can (Highwater Books)Jeffrey Brown, Clumsy: A Novel (self-published)
Mike Dawson, Cabaret, Gabagool! (self-published)
Sammy Harkham, "Study Group 12 #2" "Though I Slumber, My Heart Is Still Awake" (Study Group 12)
Anders Brekhus Nilsen, Big Questions #4: Asomatognosia (self-published)
Rick Smith and Tania Menesse, Shuck (Shuck Comics)2003 Derek Kirk Kim, Same Difference and Other Stories (self-published)Marc Bell, Rosetta (Alternative Comics), Shrimpy & Paul (Highwater Books)
Ray Friesen, RQW (Don't Eat Any Bugs Comics)
John Hankiewicz, Tepid, Eleanor E. Is Home (self-published)
Raina Telgemeier, Take Out (self-published)2004 Lauren Weinstein, Kramer's Ergot #4 (Avodah Books)Martin Cendreda, Hi-Horse Omnibus (Alternative Comics, Hi-Horse Comics)
Svetlana Chmakova, Chasing Rainbows (www.girlamatic.com, www.svetlania.com)
Dan James, The Octopi and the Ocean (Top Shelf Productions)
Leland Purvis, Suspended in Language (G.T. Labs)2005 Andy Runton, Owly (Top Shelf Productions) Joshua W. Cotter, Skyscrapers of the Midwest (AdHouse Books)
 Rebecca Dart, RabbitHead (Alternative Comics)
 Vanessa Davis, Spaniel Rage (Buenaventura Press)
 Karl Stevens, Guilty (Karl Stevens Publishing, dist. by Alternative Comics)
 2006 Hope Larson, Salamander Dream (AdHouse Books), Gray Horses (Oni Press) Andrice Arp, Mome Winter 2006 (Fantagraphics Books)
 Jonathan Bennett, Mome Fall 2005 (Fantagraphics Books)
 R. Kikuo Johnson, Night Fisher (Fantagraphics Books)
 Ben Jones, BJ & Da Dogs (Picturebox, Inc.)
 2007 Tom Neely, The Blot (I Will Destroy You) Gabrielle Bell, Lucky, Drawn & Quarterly Showcase Vol. 4 (Drawn & Quarterly)
 Scott Campbell (artist), Flight Vol. 4 (Ballantine Books), Hickee vol. 3 #3 (Alternative Comics)
 Lilli Carré, Papercutter #3 (Tugboat Press), You Ain't No Dancer Vol. 2 (New Reliable Press)
 Brandon Graham, King City (TokyoPop)
 2008 Sarah Glidden, How to Understand Israel in 60 Days or Less (self-published) Oliver East, Trains Are... Mint(Blank Slate)
 Austin English, Windy Corner #2 (Sparkplug Comic Books)
 Chuck Forsman, Snake Oil #1 (self-published)
 Lars Martinson, Tonoharu (Pliant Press/Top Shelf Productions)
 2009 Colleen Frakes, Woman King (self-published) T. Edward Bak, Drawn & Quarterly Showcase Book 5 (Drawn & Quarterly)
 Hellen Jo, Jin & Jam #1 (Sparkplug), "Diamond Heights," Papercutter #9 (Tugboat)
 Ed Luce, Wuvable Oaf (self-published)
 Amanda Vähämäki, Drawn & Quarterly Showcase Book 5 (Drawn & Quarterly)
 2010 Matt Wiegle, "The Orphan Baiter", Papercutter #13 (Tugboat Press) Rina Ayuyang, Whirlwind Wonderland (Sparkplug Comic Books & Tugboat Press)
 Rami Efal, Never Forget, Never Forgive (Studio Namu)
 Blaise Larmee, Young Lions (self-published)
 Sully, The Hipless Boy (Conundrum Press)2011 Darryl Ayo Brathwaite, House of Twelve Monthly #3 (Comixology)Tony Breed, Finn and Charlie are Hitched (self-published/online)
Jesse Jacobs, Even the Giants (AdHouse)
Jon McNaught, Birchfield Close (Nobrow Press)
Jesse Moynihan, Forming (Nobrow/online)2012 Lale Westvind, Hot Dog Beach (Self-published)Lauren Barnett, Me Likes You Very Much (Hic & Hoc Publications)
Clara Besijelle, The Lobster King (Self-published)
Tessa Brunton, Passage (Sparkplug Books)
Lila Quintero Weaver, Dark Room: A Memoir in Black and White (University of Alabama Press)2013 Sam Alden, Hawaii 1997 & Haunter (Self-published)Nathan Bulmer, Eat More Bikes (Koyama Press)
Philippa Rice, Looking Out (Hic & Hoc Publications)
Diana Thung, August Moon (Top Shelf)
Angie Wang, "The Teacup Tree," Secret Prison #7 (Self-published)2014 Cathy G. Johnson, Jeremiah; Boy Genius; Until It Runs Clear Luke Howard, Trevor
Nick Offerman, Orange; Onions
Keiler Roberts, Powdered Milk (series)
Daryl Seitchik,  Missy2015 Sophia Foster-Dimino – Sphincter; Sex FantasyM. Dean - K.M. & R.P. & MCMLXXI (1971)
 Dakota McFadzean – Don't Get Eaten by Anything
 Jane Mai – Soft
 Gina Wynbrandt – Big Pussy2016 Tillie Walden – I Love This PartKevin Budnik -Handbook
 Maia Kobabe – Tom O’Bedlam
 Sara Lautman – The Ultimate Laugh, Grape Nuts
 Carolyn Nowak – Radishes2017 Bianca Xunise – "Say Her Name" Originally published on The Nib.
Kelly Bastow – Year Long Summer
Margot Ferrick – Yours
Aud Koch – "Run" from the Oath Anthology
Isabella Rotman – Long Black Veil2018 Yasmin Omar Ata – Mis(h)adraTara Booth – How to Be Alive
Xia Gordon – The Fashion of 2004, Harvest
Rumi Hara – Nori and The Rabbits of the Moon
Tommi Parrish – The Lie and How We Told It2019 **Ebony FlowersHaleigh Buck
Emma Jayne
Mar Julia
Kelsey Wroten2020 Theo StultzAJ Dungo
Sylvia Nickerson
Andrew Lorenzi
Emil Wilson2021 Pa-LuisRoyal Dunlap
Nico Harriman
Zoe Maeve
Tess Scilipoti

Outstanding Series1997 Chris Ware, Acme Novelty Library (Fantagraphics)Jason Lutes,  Berlin (Black Eye Productions)
Daniel Clowes, Eightball (Fantagraphics)
Seth, Palookaville (Drawn & Quarterly)
Gary Spencer Millidge, Strangehaven (Abiogenesis)1998 Chris Ware, Acme Novelty Library (Fantagraphics)Daniel Clowes, Eightball (Fantagraphics)
Debbie Drechsler, Nowhere (Drawn & Quarterly)
Joe Chiappetta, Silly Daddy (self-published)
Steve Weissman, Yikes! (Alternative Press)1999 Max, The Extended Dream of Mr. D (Drawn & Quarterly)Eric Shanower, Age of Bronze (Image Comics)
Jay Hosler, Clan Apis (Active Synapse Comics)
Gary Spencer Millidge, Strangehaven (Abiogenesis)
Adam Warren, Gen 13: Magical Drama Queen Roxy (Wildstorm)2000 Dave Cooper, Weasel (Fantagraphics Books)Jay Hosler, Clan Apis (Active Synapse Comics)
Madison Clell, Cuckoo (Green Door Studios)
Bryan Talbot, Heart of Empire (Dark Horse Comics)
Jason, Mjau Mjau (Jippi Forlag)2001 Ignatz Awards cancelled after 9-11 AttacksJason Lutes, Berlin (Drawn & Quarterly)
Carla Speed McNeil, Finder (Lightspeed Press)
Mike Kunkel, Herobear and the Kid (Astonish Comics)
Sam Henderson, Magic Whistle, (Alternative Comics)
Jason, Mjau Mjau (Jippi Forlag)2002 James Kochalka Sketchbook Diaries (Top Shelf Productions)Chester Brown, Louis Riel (Drawn & Quarterly)
Sam Henderson, Magic Whistle (Alternative Comics)
David Hahn, Private Beach (Slave Labor Graphics)
Dave Cooper, Weasel (Fantagraphics Books)2003 Charles Burns, Black Hole (Fantagraphics Books)Roger Langridge, Fred the Clown (Hotel Fred Press)
Ted Stearn, Fuzz & Pluck in Splitsville (Fantagraphics Books)
Scott Roberts, Patty Cake (Slave Labor Graphics)
Gary Spencer Millidge, Strangehaven (Abiogenesis Press)2004 Carla Speed McNeil, Finder (Light Speed Productions)Charles Burns, Black Hole (Fantagraphics Books)
John Porcellino, King Cat (self-published)
Nick Bertozzi, Rubber Necker (Alternative Comics)
Kim Deitch, Stuff of Dreams (Fantagraphics Books)2005 Carla Speed McNeil, Finder (Light Speed Productions)Tomer Hanuka, Asaf Hanuka, and Etgar Keret, Bipolar (Alternative Comics)
David Heatley, Deadpan (self-published)
Los Bros Hernandez, Love and Rockets vol. II (Fantagraphics)
Joshua W. Cotter, Skyscrapers of the Midwest (AdHouse Books)
 2006 Owly by Andy Runton (Top Shelf Productions) Acme Novelty Library by Chris Ware (Fantagraphics Books)
 Big Questions by Anders Nilsen (Drawn & Quarterly)
 Love and Rockets by Los Bros. Hernandez (Fantagraphics Books)
 Optic Nerve by Adrian Tomine (Drawn & Quarterly)
 2007 Mourning Star by Kazimir Strzepek (Bodega Distribution) Atlas by Dylan Horrocks (Drawn & Quarterly)
 Delphine by Richard Sala (Fantagraphics Books/Coconico Press)
 Dungeon by Lewis Trondheim, Joann Sfar, and various (NBM)
 Love & Rockets by Los Bros Hernandez (Fantagraphics Books)
 2008 Snake Oil by Chuck Forsman (self-published) Eye of the Majestic Creature, Leslie Stein (self-published)
 Injury, Ted May, Jason Robards, and Jeff Wilson (Buenaventura Press)
 Paul series, Michel Rabagliati (Drawn & Quarterly)
 Reich, Elijah Brubaker (Sparkplug Comic Books)
 2009 Uptight, Jordan Crane (Fantagraphics) Danny Dutch, David King (Sparkplug)
 Delphine, Richard Sala (Fantagraphics/Coconino)
 Interiorae, Gabriella Giandelli (Fantagraphics/Coconino)
 Reich, Elijah Brubaker (Sparkplug)
 2010 Ganges, Kevin Huizenga (Fantagraphics Books) King-Cat Comics & Stories, John Porcellino (self-published)
 Sublife, John Pham (Fantagraphics Books)
 Summit of the Gods, Yumemakura Baku and Jiro Taniguchi (Fanfare/Ponent Mon)
 Troop 142, Mike Dawson (self-published)2011 Everything Dies, Box BrownCrickets, Sammy Harkham (self-published)
Dungeon Quest, Joe Daly (Fantagraphics Books)
Lose, Michael DeForge (Koyama Books)
Reich, Elijah Brubaker (Sparkplug Comic Books)2012 Love and Rockets: New Stories, the Hernandez brothers (Fantagraphics)Black Mass, Patrick Kyle (Mother Books)
Eye of the Majestic Creature, Leslie Stein (Self-published)
Ganges, Kevin Huizenga (Fantagraphics)
Pope Hats, Ethan Rilly (AdHouse Books)2013 Lose, Michael DeForge (Koyama Press)The Hive, Charles Burns (Pantheon)
Madtown High, Whit Taylor (self-published)
Pope Hats, Ethan Rilly (AdHouse Books)
Prison Pit, Johnny Ryan (Fantagraphics)2014 Demon, Jason ShigaThe Black Feather Falls, Ellen Lindner
Powdered Milk, Keiler Roberts
Sky in Stereo, Sacha Mardou
Towerkind, Kat Verhoeven
 2015 Sex Fantasy, Sophia Foster-Dimino Dumb, Georgia Webber
 Frontier, Ryan Sands (editor)
 March, John Lewis, Andrew Aydin and Nate Powell
 Pope Hats, Ethan Rilly
 2016 Powdered Milk, Keiler Roberts Cartozia Tales, Isaac Cates (editor)
 Demon, Jason Shiga
 Ganges, Kevin Huizenga
 Megg & Mogg & Owl, Simon Hanselmann
 2017 Chester 5000, Jess Fink Crickets, Sammy Harkham
 Frontier, Ryan Sands (editor)
 Maleficium, Sabin Cauldron
 The Old Woman, Rebecca Mock2018 Frontier – Youth in DeclineLey Lines – Czap Books
Nori – Rumi Hara
Bug Boys – Laura Knetzger
Gumballs – Erin Nations2019 The Nib Magazine – Matt BorsDaygloayhole Quarterly – Ben Passmore
Heavenly Blues – Ben Kahn/Bruno Hidalgo
Frontier – Youth in Decline
Endgames – Ru Xu2020 Fizzle – Whit TaylorThe Misplaced – Chris Callahan
SUPERPOSE – Joe Seosamh and C. Anka
kuš! – kuš! komiks
Frontier – Youth in Decline2021 Ex.Mag – Peow StudiosA Queer Prisoner’s Anthology IV – edited by Casper Cendre
Malarkey – November Garcia
Ley Lines – edited by L Nichols and Kevin Czap
Tongues – Anders Nilsen

Outstanding Comic1997 Daniel Clowes, Eightball #17 (Fantagraphics)Pete Sickman-Garner, Hey Mister #1 (Top Shelf Productions)
Dean Haspiel and Josh Neufeld, Keyhole #2 (Modern)
Walt Holcombe, King of Persia (self-published through Accordion Press)
Seth, Palookaville #10 (Drawn & Quarterly)1998 Chris Ware, Acme Novelty Library #9 (Fantagraphics)Bill Willingham, Coventry #1 (Fantagraphics)
Daniel Clowes, Eightball #19 (Fantagraphics)
Debbie Drechsler, Nowhere #3 (Drawn & Quarterly)
Joe Sacco, Stories From Bosnia #1: Soba (Drawn & Quarterly)1999 Frank Cho, Liberty Meadows #1 (Insight Studio Group)Pekar, Sacco, Stack & Warneford, American Splendor: Transatlantic Comics
James Sturm, Hundreds of Feet Below Daylight (Drawn & Quarterly)
Ben Katchor, The Jew of New York (Pantheon Books)
Joe Zabel & Gary Dumm, Oracle (Amazing Montage)2000 Chris Ware, The Acme Novelty Library #13 (Fantagraphics Books)Ron Rege and Joan Leidy, Boys (Highwater Books)
Madison Clell, Cuckoo No. 10 (Green Door Studios)
Pete Sickman-Garner, Hey Mister, The Trouble With Jesus (Top Shelf Productions)
Jordan Crane, The Last Lonely Saturday (Red Ink)2001 Ignatz Awards cancelled after 9-11 AttacksFrank #4, Jim Woodring, Fantagraphics Books
Herobear and the Kid #2, Mike Kunkel, Astonish Comics
James Kochalka's Sketchbook Diaries, James Kochalka, Top Shelf Productions
Mjau Mjau #7, Jason, Jippi Forlag
Sequential #6, Paul Hornschemeier, I Don't Get It Press2002 Daniel Clowes, Eightball #22 (Fantagraphics Books)Anders Brekhus Nilsen, Big Questions #4: Asomatognosia (self-published)
Tony Consiglio, Double Cross: More or Less (Top Shelf Productions)
James Kochalka, Sketchbook Diaries Volume 2 (Top Shelf Productions)
Jon Lewis, True Swamp: Stoneground and Hillbound (Alternative Comics)2003 Nick Bertozzi, Rubber Necker #2, (Alternative Comics)Adam Suerte, Aprendiz Book 1 (self-published)
Charles Burns, Black Hole #10 (Fantagraphics Books)
David Collier, Collier's Vol. 2 #2 (Drawn & Quarterly)
David Lasky and Greg Stump, Urban Hipster #2  (Alternative Comics)2004 Daniel Clowes, Eightball #23 (Fantagraphics Books)Charles Burns, Black Hole #11 (Fantagraphics Books)
Kim Deitch, Stuff of Dreams #2 (Fantagraphics Books)
John Hankiewicz, Tepid Summer 2003 (Tepid Comics)
John Porcellino, King Cat #62 (Self-published)2005 Kevin Huizenga, Or Else #1 (Drawn & Quarterly)Anders Nilsen, Dogs & Water (Drawn & Quarterly)
Los Bros. Hernandez Love & Rockets #13 (Fantagraphics)
Los Bros. Hernandez, Love & Rockets #12 (Fantagraphics)
Marc Bell, Worn Tuff Elbow #1 (Fantagraphics)
 2006 Schizo #4 by Ivan Brunetti (Fantagraphics Books) Big Questions #7 by Anders Nilsen (Drawn & Quarterly)
 Ganges #1 by Kevin Huizenga (Fantagraphics Books)
 Optic Nerve #10 by Adrian Tomine (Drawn & Quarterly)
 Stuff of Dreams #3 by Kim Deitch (Fantagraphics Books)
 2007 Optic Nerve #11 by Adrian Tomine (Drawn & Quarterly) Doctor Id by Adam McGovern and Paolo Leandri (Indie Ink Studios)
 Fuzz & Pluck in Splitsville #4 by Ted Stearn (Fantagraphics Books)
 Love & Rockets vol. 2 #18 by Los Bros Hernandez (Fantagraphics Books)
 Monster Parade #1 by Ben Catmull (Fantagraphics Books)
 2008 Snake Oil #1 by Chuck Forsman (self-published) Cryptic Wit #2, Gerald Jablonski (self-published)
 Department of Art, Dunya Jankovic (self-published)
 Lucky Vol. 2 #2, Gabrielle Bell (Drawn & Quarterly)
 Palooka-ville #19, Seth (Drawn & Quarterly)
 2009 Uptight #3, Jordan Crane (Fantagraphics) Danny Dutch #1, David King (Sparkplug)
 Dead Ringer, Jason T. Miles (La Mano)
 Interiorae #3, Gabriella Giandelli (Fantagraphics/Coconino)
 Reich #6,  Elijah Brubaker (Sparkplug)
 2010 I Want You, Lisa Hanawalt (Buenaventura Press) Blammo #6, Noah Van Sciver (Kilgore Books)
 Eschew #2, Robert Sergel (Sparkplug Comic Books)
 Flesh and Bone, Julia Gfrörer (Sparkplug Comic Books)
 Sublife #2, John Pham (Fantagraphics Books)2011 Lose #3, Michael DeForge (Koyama Press)Crickets #3, Sammy Harkham (self-published)
Danger Country #1, Levon Jihanian
Habitat #2, Dunja Jankovic
The Magic Hedge, Marian Runk2012 Pterodactyl Hunters, Brendan Leach (Top Shelf) Hot Dog Beach #2, Lale Westvind (Self-published)
 Passage, Tessa Brunton (Sparkplug Books)
 The Sixth Gun #17, Brian Hurtt and Cullen Bunn (Oni Press)
 Pope Hats #2, Ethan Rilly (AdHouse Books)2013 Pope Hats #3, Ethan Rilly (AdHouse Books) Hyperspeed to Nowhere, Lale Westvind (Self-published)
 The Life Problem, Austin English (Drippybone Books)
 Looking Out, Philippa Rice (Hic & Hoc Publications)
 St. Owl's Bay, Simon Hanselmann (Self-published)2014 Wicked Chicken Queen, Sam Alden (Retrofit Comics/Big Planet Comics) Blammo #8, Noah Van Sciver
 Cosplayers, Dash Shaw
 It Will All Hurt #2, Farel Dalrymple
 Misliving Amended, Adam Buttrick2015 The Oven, Sophie Goldstein Borb, Jason Little
 The Nature of Nature, Disa Wallander
 Pope Hats #4, Ethan Rilly
 Weeping Flower, Grows in Darkness, Kris Mukai2016 Fantasy Sports #1, Sam BosmaAs the Crow Flies, Melanie Gillman
Be Good, John Martz
Patience, Daniel Clowes
Shrine of the Monkey God, from Kramers Ergot 9, Kim Deitch2017 Your Black Friend, Ben PassmoreCanopy, Karine Bernadou
Libby’s Dad, Eleanor Davis
Public Relations #10, Matthew Sturges, Dave Justus, Steve Rolston, Annie Wu
Sunburning, Keiler Roberts2018 Hot to Be Alive – Tara BoothRecollection – Alyssa Berg
Hot Summer Nights – Freddy Carrasco
Whatsa Paintoonist – Jerry Moriarty
Baopu – Yao Xiao2019 Check Please! – Ngozi UkazuLorna – Benji Nate
Infinite Wheat Paste #7 – Pidge
The Saga of Metalbeard – Joshua Paddon & Matthew Hoddy
Egg Cream – Liz Suburbia2020 Cry Wolf Girl – Ariel RiesMy Dog Ivy – Gabrielle Bell
Theth Tomorrow Forever – Josh Bayer
Cosmoknights – Hannah Templer
Mooncakes – Wendy Xu and Suzanne Walker2021 Leaf Lace – Ashanti FortsonFrancis Bacon – EA Bethea
The Dog & The Cat – Dominique Duong
Rhapsodie – Maddi Gonzalez
A Cordial Invitation – Adam Szym

Outstanding Minicomic1997 The Perfect Planet, James Kochalka Hey Mister #4, Pete Sickman-Garner
King-Cat Comics #52, John Porcellino
Magic Whistle #9, Sam Henderson
Out There #5, Alan Hunt1998 Amy Unbounded, Rachel Hartman (Pug House Press)Bathroom Girls, Yvonne Mojica
King Cat Comics, John Porcellino
Magic Boy Does Laundry, James Kochalka
Oaf, Matt Brinkman1999 Fireball #7, Brian Ralph (Highwater Books)Tales of the Great Unspoken, Aaron Augenblick (Self-published)
Ped Xing, Androo Robinson (Self-published)
Bolol Belittle, Mat Brinkman (Self-published)
Noe-Fie #8, Kurt Wolfgang (Noe-Fie Mono-Media)2000 LowJinx #2, edited by Kurt Wolfgang (Noe-Fie Mono-Media)Angry Youth Comics No. 11, Johnny Ryan (Self-published)
Jug, Androo Robinson (Self-published)
Timberdoodle, Jon Kerschbaum  (Self-published)
True Stories, Swear to God, Tom Beland (Self-published)2001 Ignatz Awards cancelled after 9-11 AttacksAmy Unbounded No. 12, Rachel Hartman (Pug House Press)
Democracy: Mime Complaint No. 5, Jesse Reklaw (Self-published)
Jumbo Jape, Sean Bieri (Self-published)
Low Jinx 3: The Big Rip-Off, edited by Kurt Wolfgang  (Noe-Fie Mono-Media)
Tepid Spring 2001, John Hankiewicz (self-published)2002 Artichoke Tales #1, Megan Kelso (Highwater Books)Double Cross Assortment, Tony Consiglio (Self-published)
Gloriana: Super Monster #14, Kevin Huizenga (Self-published)
Homecoming, John Kerschbaum (Fontanelle Press)
Long Tail Kitty: Heaven, Lark Pien (Self-published)2003 I Am Going to Be Small, Jeffrey Brown (self-published)Josh Comics, Josh Sullivan
Lo-Horse #1, David Lasky and Jesse Reklaw
Take Out, Raina Telgemeier
That Thing You Fall Into, Diana Tamblyn2004 Lucky #3, Gabrielle Bell (Self-published)Big Questions #6, Anders Nilsen (Self-published)
Quantum Entanglement, Spooky Action at a Distance, Teleportation and You, Jim Ottaviani and Roger Langridge (G.T. Labs)
Thankless Job, Pat Lewis (Lunchbreak Comics)
Underground: Souvenir, Matthew Bellisle (Gravity/DSN)2005 Phase 7, Alec Longstreth (Self-published)Couch Tag #2, Jesse Reklaw  (Self-published)
Dance, John Hankiewicz (Self-published)
Monday, Andy Hartzell (Self-published)
Ouija Interview #3, Sarah Becan (Self-published)2006 Monsters, Ken DahlComicore Jr., Paulette Poullet
Gaylord Phoenix #4, Edie Fake
Trackrabbit, Geoff Vasile
Window #8, Dave Lapp2007 P.S. Comics #3, Minty LewisBurning Building Comix, Jeff Zwirek
The Monkey and the Crab, Shawn Cheng and Sara Edward-Corbett
Noose, Mark Burrier
Seven More Days of Not Getting Eaten, Matt Wiegle2008 Bluefuzz, Jesse ReklawDorado Park, Lilli Carré
How To Understand Israel in 60 Days or Less, Sarah Glidden
Ochre Ellipse #2, Jonas Madden-Connor
Swell, Juliacks2009 Stay Away From Other People, Lisa HanawaltClaptrap #2, Onsmith
Just So You Know #1, Joey Alison Sayers
Stewbrew, Kelly Froh & Max Clotfelter
Xoc #1, Matt Dembicki2010 Rambo 3.5, Jim RuggDon't Drink from the Sea, Lilli Carré
Stories by... Vol. 1, Martin Cendreda
Troop 142, Mike Dawson
Water Column #3, Josh Frankel2011 Ben Died of a Train, Box BrownGaylord Phoenix #5, Edie Fake
Danger Country #1, Levon Jihanian
Morning Song, Laura Terry
Trans-Utopia, Tom Kaczynski (Uncivilized Books)2012 The Monkey in the Basement and Other Delusions, Corinne Mucha (Retrofit Comics)The Death of Elijah Lovejoy, Noah Van Sciver (2D Cloud)
Hypnotic Induction Technique, Grant Reynolds (Self-published)
Ramble On #2, Calvin Wong (Self-published)
RAV #6, Mickey Zacchilli (Self-published)2013 The End of the Fucking World #16, Charles Forsman (Fantagraphics)Il Cammino Delle Capre, Kris Mukai & Zachary Zezima (Self-published)
Hawaii 1997, Sam Alden (Self-published)
Lawaway, Joseph Lambert (Self-published)
Powdered Milk Vol. 10: The Man Who Could Not Read, Keiler Roberts (Self-published)2014 House of Women, Sophie GoldsteinThe Grassy Knoll, Nick Drnaso
Never Forgets, Yumi Sakugawa (Self-published)
Test Tube #1, Carlos Gonzales
Up to the Top, Ian Sampson2015 Sex Fantasy #4, Sophia Foster-Dimino Devil's Slice of Life, Patrick Crotty (Peow! Studio)
 Epoxy 5, John Pham
 King Cat #75, John Porcellino (Self-published)
 Whalen: A Reckoning, Audry2016 Radishes, Carolyn NowakThe Experts, Sophie Franz
Laffy Meal, Pranas T. Naujokaitis
Maps to the Suns, Sloane Leong
The Unofficial Cuckoo’s Nest, Luke Healy2017 Tender-Hearted, Hazel NewlevantThe Man Who Came Down the Attic Stairs, Celine Loup
Our Tale of Woe, Keren Katz & Geffen Refaeli
Reverse Flaneur, M. Sabine Rear
Same Place Same Time, Ann Xu2018 Say It With Noodles: On Learning to Speak the Language of Food – Shing Yin KhorDog Nurse – Margot Ferrick
Greenhouse – Debbie Fong
Common Blessings & Common Curses – Maritsa Patrinos
Mothball 88 – Kevin Reilly2019 Trans Girls Hit the Town – Emma JayneGonzalo – Jed McGowan
Silver Wire – Kriota Willberg
Cherry – InésEstrada
YLLW YLLW YLLW – Mar Julia2020 Black Hole Heart – Cathy G JohnsonI Feel Weird #4 – Haleigh Buck
Chapter Two – Keren Katz
The Gulf – Nguyen Nguyen
Canvas – Theo K. Stultz2021 Bodyseed – Casey NowackSlum Clearance Symphony – Brendan Leach
Lavender Scare – Arantza Peña Popo
Montana Diary – Whit Taylor
The Drain Pipe – Leda Zawacki

Outstanding Online Comic2001 Ignatz Awards cancelled after 9-11 AttacksBen Jones, Future Genies of Mush Past
Scott McCloud, I Can't Stop Thinking
Jonathan Morris, Jeremy
Demian5, When I Am King
Scott McCloud, Zot! Hearts and Minds2002 Jason Little, BeeTom Hart, Hutch Owen: Public Relations
Jordan Crane, Keeping Two
Derek Kirk Kim, Small Stories
Tracy White, Traced2003 James Kochalka, American ElfGabrielle Bell, Bell's Home Journal
Ted Slampyak, Jazz Age
Nick Bertozzi, The Salon
Jesse Reklaw, Slow Wave2004 James Kochalka, American ElfPatrick Farley, Apocamon
J.J. Naas, Desert Rocks
Timothy Kreider, The Pain … When Will it End?
Craig Boldman, Tailipoe2005 Nicholas Gurewitch, The Perry Bible Fellowshipdeadmouse, Ballad
Kazu Kibuishi, Copper
Jenn Manley Lee, Dicebox
Steven Manale, Superslackers2006 Nicholas Gurewitch, The Perry Bible Fellowship A Lesson Is Learned But The Damage Is Irreversible by David Hellman and Dale Beran
 Claviger by Ronnie Casson
 Micrographica by Renee French
 Thingpart by Joe Sayers
 2007 Achewood by Chris Onstad Grace by Kris Dresen
 Persimmon Cup by Nick Bertozzi
 Thingpart by Joe Sayers
 Wondermark by David Malki !
 2008 Achewood by Chris Onstad Danny Dutch by David King
 Slow Wave by  Jesse Reklaw
 Thingpart by Joey Sayers
 Traced by Tracy White
 2009 Year of the Rat, Cayetano Garza Bodyworld, Dash Shaw
 Danny Dutch, David King
 Thingpart, Joey Alison Sayers
 Vanessa Davis's comics for Tablet
 2010 Troop 142, Mike Dawson Callahan Online, John Callahan
 I Think You're Sauceome, Sarah Becan
 The Lesttrygonians, Stephen Gilpin
 Reliable Comics, David King2011 Hark! A Vagrant, Kate BeatonAlphabet Horror, Nate Marsh
A Cartoonist’s Diary, Pascal Girard
Finn and Charlie are Hitched, Tony Breed
Lucky, Gabrielle Bell2012 SuperMutant Magic Academy, Jillian TamakiAmazing Facts…and Beyond! with Leon Beyond, Dan Zettwoch and Kevin Huizenga
Black Is the Color, Julia Gfrorer
Lucky, Gabrielle Bell
Starslip, Kris Straub2013 SuperMutant Magic Academy, Jillian TamakiBird Boy, Annie Szabla
Gabby's Playhouse, Ken Dahl & Gabby Schulz
Haunter, Sam Alden
July Diary, Gabrielle Bell2014 Vattu, Evan DahmBand for Life, Anya Davidson
Big Dogs at Nite, Dane Martin
Demon, Jason Shiga
On Hiatus, Pete Toms2015 The Bloody Footprint, Lilli CarréCarriers, Lauren Weinstein
Mom Body, Rebecca Roher
O Human Star, Blue Delliquanti
Witchy, Ariel Ries2016 Octopus Pie, Meredith GranA Cartoonist’s Diary, Rina Ayuyang
Just Doing My Job, Gynnis Fawkes
A Small Revolution, Samantha Leriche-Gionet (AKA “Boum”)
Vattu, Evan Dahm2017 The Meek, Der-shing HelmerDisability in the Age of Trump, Amanda Scurti
Normal Person/Maine Vacation, Lauren Weinstein
That's Not Who We Are, Mike Dawson
Woman World, Aminder Dhaliwal2018 Lara Croft Was My Family – Carta MonirWoman World – Aminder Dhaliwal
The Wolves Outside – Jesse England
A Fire Story – Brian Files
A Part of Me is Still Unknown – Meg O’Shea2019 Full Court Crush – Hannah BlumenreichIsle of Elsi – Alec Longstreth
That’s Not My Name! – Hannako Lambert
What Doctors Know About CPR – Nathan Gray
About Face – Nate Powell2020 Witchy – Ariel RiesI Exist – Breena Nuñez
Like the Tide – Isabella Rotman
Gabby Schulz
SUPERPOSE – Joe Seosamh and C. Anka2021 Birds of Maine – Michael DeForgeLeaf Lace – Ashanti Fortson
Shadows Become You – Susannah Lohr
Mr. Boop – Alec Robbins
I Do Not Want to Write Today – Shing Yin Khor

Outstanding Anthology or Collection (discontinued)2005 Diary of a Mosquito Abatement Man by John Porcellino (La Mano) Above and Below: Two Tales of the American Frontier by James Sturm (Drawn & Quarterly)
 Dead Herring Comics, edited by Actus (Actus Independent Comics)
 Fred the Clown by Roger Langridge (Fantagraphics Books)
 Hutch Owen: Unmarketable by Tom Hart (Top Shelf Productions)
 2006 Black Hole by Charles Burns (Pantheon) Castle Waiting by Linda Medley (Fantagraphics Books)
 Drawn & Quarterly Showcase #3 by Matt Broersma, Genevieve Elverum, and Sammy Harkham (Drawn & Quarterly)
 The Push Man and Other Stories by Yoshihiro Tatsumi (Drawn & Quarterly)
 Squirrel Mother by Megan Kelso (Fantagraphics Books)
 2007 Curses by Kevin Huizenga (Drawn & Quarterly) Drawn & Quarterly Showcase Vol. 4 by Gabrielle Bell, Martin Cendrera, and Dan Zettwoch (Drawn & Quarterly)
 King-Cat Classix by John Porcellino (Drawn & Quarterly)
 Misery Loves Comedy by Ivan Brunetti (Fantagraphics Books)
 Moomin Book One by Tove Jansson (Drawn & Quarterly)
 2008 Papercutter #7, edited by Greg Means (Tugboat Press) Inkweed, Chris Wright (Sparkplug Comic Books)
 Little Lulu Vol. 18, John Stanley (Dark Horse)
 Pond Life, John Broadley (PictureBox)
 Windy Corner #2, edited by Austin English (Sparkplug Comic Books)
 2009 Kramer’s Ergot #7, ed. Sammy Harkham (Buenaventura) Abandoned Cars, Tim Lane (Fantagraphics)
 Against Pain, Ron Regé, Jr. (Drawn & Quarterly)
 Drawn & Quarterly Showcase Book 5, T. Edward Bak, Anneli Furmark, Amanda Vähämäki (Drawn & Quarterly)
 Fuzz and Pluck: Splitsville by Ted Stearn (Fantagraphics)
 2010 Masterpiece Comics, R. Sikoryak (Drawn & Quarterly)The Hipless Boy, Sully (Conundrum Press)
Lemon Styles, David King (Sparkplug Comic Books)
Red Snow, Susumu Katsumata (Drawn & Quarterly)
Ten Thousand Things to Do, Jesse Reklaw (self-published)2011 I Will Bite You, Joseph Lambert (Secret Acres)Black Eye, edited by Ryan Standfest (Rotland Press)
Gay Genius, edited by Annie Murphy (Sparkplug)
Make Me a Woman, Vanessa Davis (Drawn & Quarterly)
Three #1, edited by Robert Kirby2012 Hark! A Vagrant, Kate Beaton (Drawn & Quarterly)Big Questions, Anders Nilsen (Drawn & Quarterly)
The Man Who Grew His Beard, Olivier Schrauwen (Fantagraphics Books)
Nobrow #6, Various artists (Nobrow)
Ojitos Borrosos, Inés Estrada (Self-published)2013 Very Casual, Michael DeForge (Koyama Press)Freddie Stories, Lynda Barry (Drawn & Quarterly)
Heads or Tails, Lille Carré (Fantagraphics Books)
Peter Bagge's Other Stuff, Peter Bagge (Fantagraphics Books)
Tusen Hjärtan Stark #1, Various, ed. by Austin English (Domino Books)2014 QU33R, edited by Robert KirbyAmazing Facts and Beyond, Kevin Huizenga and Dan Zettwoch
The End, Anders Nilsen
Eye of the Majestic Creature (Vol. 2), Leslie Stein
Sock Monkey Treasury, Tony Millionaire2015 How To Be Happy, Eleanor Davis Drawn & Quarterly, 25 Years of Contemporary Cartooning, Comics, and Graphic Novel, Tom Devlin, Chris Oliveros, Peggy Burns, Tracy Hurren, and Julia Pohl-Miranda (producers)
 An Entity Observes All Things, Box Brown (Retrofit Comics/Big Planet Comics)
 Pope Hats, #4, Ethan Rilly
 SuperMutant Magic Academy, Jillian Tamaki2016 Step Aside Pops, Kate BeatonBeverly, Nick Drnaso
Beyond: The Queer Sci Fi and Fantasy Anthology, Sfé R. Monster and Taneka Stotts
The Complete Wimmen’s Comix, Trina Robbins
Killing And Dying, Adrian Tomine

Outstanding Graphic Novel or Collection (discontinued)
 1997 It's A Good Life if You Don't Weaken by Seth (Drawn & Quarterly) At The Seams by Ed Brubaker (Alternative Press)
 Julius Knipl, Real Estate Photographer: Stories by Ben Katchor (Little, Brown)
 L'Ascension Du Haut Mal by David B. (L'Association)
 Lost in the Alps by Cosey (NBM)
 1998 Ghost World by Daniel Clowes (Fantagraphics) Views of the Warehouse District by Martin Tom Dieck (Westhampton House)
 Frank vol. 2 by Jim Woodring (Fantagraphics)
 The Little Man by Chester Brown (Drawn & Quarterly)
 Titanic Tales edited by Mark Wheatley (Insight Studios)
 1999 Cages by Dave McKean (Kitchen Sink) Hey Mister: Celebrity Roast by Pete Sickman-Garner (Top Shelf Productions)
 Hicksville by Dylan Horrocks (Black Eye)
 Time Warp by Ed Hillyer (Slab-O-Concrete)
 Tiny Bubbles by James Kochalka (Highwater Books)
 2000 From Hell by Alan Moore and Eddie Campbell (Eddie Campbell Comics, distributed by Top Shelf Productions) Banks/Eubanks by Tom Hart (Top Shelf Productions)
 Clan Apis by Jay Hosler (Active Synapse)
 Comix 2000 various, (L'Association)
 Drawn & Quarterly, Volume 3 various, (Drawn & Quarterly)
 2001 Ignatz Awards cancelled after 9-11 Attacks Box Office Poison by Alex Robinson (Top Shelf Productions)
 Jimmy Corrigan: The Smartest Kid On Earth by Chris Ware (Pantheon Books)
 Mail Order Bride by Mark Kalesniko (Fantagraphics Books)
 Safe Area Gorazde: The War in Eastern Bosnia, 1992–1995 by Joe Sacco (Fantagraphics Books)
 Snake 'n' Bacon's Cartoon Cabaret by Michael Kupperman (Avon Books)
 2002 The Golem's Mighty Swing by James Sturm (Drawn & Quarterly) Fallout, edited by Jim Ottaviani (G.T. Labs)
 Haw! by Ivan Brunetti (Fantagraphics Books)
 Non #5, edited by Jordan Crane (Red Ink Press)
 Summer of Love by Debbie Drechsler (Drawn & Quarterly)
 2003 Three Fingers by Rich Koslowski (Top Shelf Productions) Beg The Question by Bob Fingerman (Fantagraphics Books)
 Epileptic by David B (L'Association)
 The Frank Book by Jim Woodring (Fantagraphics Books)
 Nightmare Alley by Spain Rodriguez and William Lindsay Gresham (Fantagraphics Books)
 2004 Blankets by Craig Thompson (Top Shelf Productions) The Fixer by Joe Sacco (Drawn & Quarterly)
 Louis Riel by Chester Brown (Drawn & Quarterly)
 McSweeney's Quarterly Concern #13, Edited by Chris Ware (McSweeney's, Ltd.)
 Teratoid Heights by Matt Brinkman (Highwater Books)

Outstanding Debut Comic (discontinued)2000 Dork #8 by Evan Dorkin (Slave Labor Graphics)2002 Pulpatoon Pilgrimage by Joel Priddy (AdHouse Books)2003 Studygroup12 #3 edited by Zack Soto2004 Teen Boat #6: Vote Boat by Dave Roman and John Green (Cryptic Press)2005 Will You Still Love Me if I Wet the Bed? by Liz Prince (Top Shelf Productions)2006 Class of '99 by Josh Eiserike (Self-Published)2007 Papercutter #6 edited by Alec Longstreth (Tugboat Press)2008 Swallow Me Whole by Nate Powell (Top Shelf Productions)Ignatz Awards Jury1997Jessica Abel
Chester Brown
Ed Brubaker
Mark Wheatley
Joe Zabel1998Michael Cohen
Tom Devlin
Tom Hart
Marc Hempel
Dylan Horrocks1999Frank Cho
Jordan Crane
Jon Lewis
Carla Speed McNeil
Jim Ottaviani2000Donna Barr
Sean Bieri
Phil Foglio
Dean Haspiel
Jason Little2001Matt Feazell
Roberta Gregory
Jon "Bean" Hastings
Sam Henderson
James Sturm2002Suzanne Baumann
Nick Bertozzi
David Lasky
Alex Robinson2003Pam Bliss
Ariel Bordeaux
David Hahn
Batton Lash
Matt Madden2004Kevin Huizenga
Megan Kelso
Rich Koslowski
Layla Lawlor
Steve Lieber2005Jennifer Daydreamer
Shaenon Garrity
James Kochalka
Jeff Parker
Dan Zettwoch2006Jeffrey Brown
Henry Chamberlain
Justin Hall
Laurenn McCubbin
Jim Rugg2007Sara Edward-Corbett
Paul Hornschemeier
Steve MacIsaac
Jesse Reklaw
Zack Soto2008Gabrielle Bell
Farel Dalrymple
Eleanor Davis
John Hankiewicz
Andy Hartzell2009Lilli Carré
Vanessa Davis
Robert Kirby
Scott Mills
Laura Park2010Trevor Alixopulos
Joshua Cotter
Rob G
David Kelly
Anders Nilsen2011Rina Ayuyang
Mike Dawson
Kris Dresen
Theo Ellsworth
John Porcellino2012Edie Fake
Minty Lewis
Dylan Meconis
Lark Pien
Julia Wertz2013Lisa Hanawalt
Dustin Harbin
Damien Jay
Sakura Maku
Jason Shiga2014Darryl Ayo
Austin English
Melissa Mendes
Thein Pham
Whit Taylor2015Lamar Abrams
Cara Bean
Robyn Chapman
Sophie Goldstein
Corrine Mucha2016Tony Breed
Summer Pierre
Keiler Roberts
C. Spike Trotman
J.T. Yost2017Neil Brideau
Glynnis Fawkes
Sara Lautman
Trungles
David Willis

Ignatz Awards Committee1997 Chris Oarr, Coordinator1998 Chris Oarr, Coordinator
 Jeff Alexander1999 Jeff Alexander, Coordinator2000–2006 Jeff Alexander, Coordinator
 Karon Flage
 Greg McElhatton2007–2010 Greg McElhatton, Coordinator
 Jeff Alexander
 Karon Flage2011–2012 Eden Miller, Coordinator
 Greg McElhatton
 Karon Flage2013–2016 Eden Miller, Coordinator2017–present'''
 Dan Stafford, Coordinator

References

External links
Ignatz Awards Official Website

Comics awards
Minicomics
Awards established in 1997
1997 establishments in Maryland
Krazy Kat